Phryganea is a genus of giant casemakers in the family Phryganeidae. There are about 13 described species in the genus.

The type species for Phryganea is Phryganea grandis C. Linnaeus.

Species

References

Further reading

 
 
 
 

Trichoptera genera